All the Mornings Bring is an album by the American jazz instrumentalist Paul McCandless, recorded in 1979 for the Elektra label. It was re-released in 2010 by Wounded Bird Records.

Production
McCandless spent four years working on All the Mornings Bring. The Oxford Companion to Jazz noted McCandless's improvisational talents on English horn and oboe.

Critical reception
The Santa Cruz Sentinel called the album "unique," writing that McCandless "has somewhat bridged the gap between classical and jazz music."

Track listing
 "St. Philomene" - 10:19
 "Bowspirit" - 2:55
 "On, Elf Bird!" - 5:12
 "Slumber Song" - 3:04
 "Palimpsest" - 5:47
 "All The Mornings Bring" - 4:42
 "Saraband" - 2:57
 "Song For One" - 0:55
 "Moon And Mind" - 7:36
Recorded January 1979, Longview Farms, North Brookfield, Massachusetts, and Columbia 30th Street Studio, New York City.

Personnel
Paul McCandless - bass clarinet, flute,  English horn, oboe
David Samuels - vibraphone, marimba, percussion
Doren Glickman - bassoon
Loren Glickman - bassoon
Eddie Gomez - bass guitar
Peter Gordon - French horn
Walter Kane - clarinet
Art Lande - percussion, piano
Jennifer Sperry - English horn, oboe
David Tofani - clarinet

References

1979 albums
Paul McCandless albums